Delta Central Senatorial District in Delta State, Nigeria covers 8 local governments which include Ethiope East, Ethiope West, Sapele, Okpe, Ughelli North, Ughelli South, Udu and Uvwie. The headquarters (collation centre) of Delta Central Senatorial District is Udu. Deputy President of the 9th Senate, Ovie Omo –Agege is from Delta Central Senatorial District. He is  a member of the All Progressives Congress.

List of senators representing Delta Central

References 

Politics of Delta State
Senatorial districts in Nigeria